2005 Yokohama F. Marinos season

Competitions

Domestic results

J.League 1

Emperor's Cup

Yokohama F. Marinos received a bye to the fourth round as being part of the J.League Division 1.

J.League Cup

Yokohama F. Marinos received a bye to the quarter-finals in order to avoid scheduling conflicts due to their participation in the AFC Champions League.
Quarter-finals

Semi-finals

Japanese Super Cup

Yokohama F. Marinos qualified for this tournament as winners of the 2004 season.

International results

A3 Champions Cup

Yokohama F. Marinos qualified for this tournament as winners of the 2004 season.

AFC Champions League

Yokohama F. Marinos qualified for this tournament as winners of the 2004 season.

Friendlies

Player statistics

Other pages
 J.League official site

Yokohama F. Marinos
Yokohama F. Marinos seasons